Emeric Santo (14 June 1921 – 29 July 2011) was an Australian fencer. He competed in the team sabre event at the 1956 Summer Olympics.

References

1921 births
2011 deaths
Australian male fencers
Olympic fencers of Australia
Fencers at the 1956 Summer Olympics
People from Újpest
Sportspeople from Budapest